European route E 94 is part of the International E-road network, which is a series of main roads in Europe.

The E 94 starts in western Greece in Corinth, Greece and through Attiki Odos (A6) runs east through Megara and Eleusis and ends in the Greek capital of Athens at the Saronic Gulf in the east.

gallery

External links 
 UN Economic Commission for Europe: Overall Map of E-road Network (2007)

94
E094